Mark Gardner may refer to:

Mark Gardner (baseball) (born 1962), former pitcher in Major League Baseball
Mark Gardner (inventor) (born 1955), American inventor
Mark Gardner (footballer) (1884–1949), Australian rules footballer
Mark Gardner (murderer) (1956–1999), murderer executed by the State of Arkansas

See also
Mark Gardener (born 1969), English rock musician
Mark Gardiner (born 1966), English footballer
Mark Gardiner (gamer) (born 1983), Scottish semi-professional video gamer